is a 1973 Japanese action film directed by Tsugunobu Kotani. It is  2nd of Detective Gokiburi series. The film is based on Isao Shinoka's manga "Gokiburi Deka". Narugami Ryo is a detective nicknamed "Gokiburi"(cockroach).

Cast
 Tetsuya Watari as Narugami Ryo
 Tetsuro Tamba as Kojima
 Masaya Oki as Hashimoto
Yoshiro Aoki as Ito
 Kōji Nanbara as Shimura
 Kaku Takashina as Yoshida
 Tōru Minegishi as Yamaoka Masashi
 Shunsuke Kariya as Nakagawa
 Toru Abe as Kuroda Tsuyoshi

References

External links
 

Toho films
Yakuza films
Japanese crime films
1970s Japanese-language films
1973 crime films
1973 films
1970s Japanese films